The Battle of Copenhagen also known as the Assault on Copenhagen on 11 February 1659 was a major battle during the Second Northern War, taking place during the siege of Copenhagen by the Swedish army.

Background 
During the Northern Wars, the Swedish army under Charles X Gustav of Sweden, after invading the Danish mainland of Jutland, swiftly crossed the frozen straits and occupied most of the Danish island of Zealand, with the invasion beginning on 11 February 1658. This forced the Danes to sue for peace. A preliminary treaty, the Treaty of Taastrup, was signed on 18 February 1658, with the final treaty, the Treaty of Roskilde, signed on 26 February 1658, granting Sweden major territorial gains.

The Swedish king, however, was not content with his stunning victory, and at the Privy Council held at Gottorp on 7 July Charles X Gustav resolved to wipe his inconvenient rival from the map of Europe. Without any warning, in defiance of international treaty, he ordered his troops to attack Denmark–Norway a second time.

The Swedish armies had never left Denmark after the peace and already occupied all of Denmark apart from the capital, Copenhagen. After a failed assault, Copenhagen was put under siege in the hope of breaking the defense by starvation. In October 1658 however a Dutch relief fleet under Lieutenant-Admiral Jacob van Wassenaer Obdam defeated the Swedish fleet in the Battle of the Sound and lifted the sea blockade so that supplies and an auxiliary army could reach the capital. The Dutch were an ally of Denmark from the Anglo-Dutch Wars and were afraid that Swedish control of the Baltic would ruin their profitable trade in this area.

The opposing forces 
After the Copenhageners had withstood about six months of siege, bombardments and attacks, the Swedes attempted to take the city by a grand assault, as a prolonged siege no longer offered any hope of success, now that the sea lanes had been opened by the Dutch.

The Copenhageners had been forewarned by spies, so they had planned their defences well and stockpiled weapons and ammunition.

The walls of Copenhagen bristled with about 300 pieces of cannon, mortars and other artillery, while a diverse mixture of weapons, ranging from muskets and arquebuses to morningstars, scythes, boiling water and tar had been readied for action. Craftsmen, students and other civilians were divided into nine companies, and each of these companies was allocated a part of the wall to defend. The professional soldiers were stationed at the outer field works, Kastellet (the Citadel) and Slotsholmen (the Castle Islet).

The Swedish army consisted of about 9,000 professional soldiers, while the Danish defenders, a mixture of professionals, militia and raw civilians, were of an equal number.

The assault 

The Swedes started the action by making a diversionary attack at Christianshavn and Slotsholmen on the evening of 9 February. They were repulsed, and the Swedes left one of their assault bridges behind, which the Danes captured and measured. They found that the Swedish assault bridges were 36 feet long, and thus they realised that they could render these bridges useless by making the ice-free parts of the moats wider than that.

The moats and the beaches had been kept free of ice, and now the ice free zones were widened to 44 feet with help from 600 Dutch marines. The ice was thick, and the work was done in heavy snowfall from 4 o'clock in the afternoon till evening on 10 February.

Spies reported that the Swedish army had moved from their camp, Carlstad, at Brønshøj and had taken up positions behind Valby Hill, and when the Swedes began their assault about midnight the same evening, they met heavy resistance.

The main assaults were made against Christianshavn and Vestervold, but the chopped-up ice and the massed weaponry on the wall made the densely packed attackers pay a horrific toll in lives. Still, they fought their way to the top of the wall, and fierce hand-to-hand fighting broke out.

When the Swedes realised that the assaults on the Western part of the wall were in trouble, the choice was made to make a supporting attack at Østerport. The Swedes got very close to Nyboder and were in the process of crossing the moat, when they fell victim to a well-conducted ambush, and they withdrew with heavy losses.

At about five in the morning the Swedes gave up and retreated. They had taken severe losses. Before the walls 600 bodies were counted, and many more had perished in the ice-cold water and were never found. On top of that there were many wounded. The Danes had only suffered about 14 dead.

Aftermath 
The Dutch in the spring of 1659 sent a second fleet and army under Vice-Admiral De Ruyter to further reinforce the city and cut the Swedish supply lines so that the siege would have to be lifted altogether. After Nyborg had been taken by a Dutch-Danish force, the Danish Isles were abandoned by the Swedes. Negotiations were opened and the Treaty of Copenhagen was signed on 27 May 1660, and it marked the conclusion of the Second Northern War between Sweden and the alliance of Denmark and the Polish–Lithuanian Commonwealth. In conjunction with the Treaty of Roskilde, it ended a generation of warfare and established the present-day borders of Denmark, Norway and Sweden.

See also
 Fortifications of Copenhagen (17th century)

References
Citations

Bibliography
 

Second Northern War
Battles involving Denmark
Battles involving Sweden
1659 in Denmark
Conflicts in 1659
History of Copenhagen
17th century in Copenhagen
Sieges involving the Dutch Republic
Battles involving the Dutch Republic